Bahía Piña Airport  is an airport serving Puerto Piña, a Pacific coastal village in the Darién Province of Panama.

The runway starts at the shore next to the village, and runs inland into the forest. There is mountainous terrain to the north, and rising terrain both east and west. South approach and departure are over the water.

Airlines and destinations

See also
Transport in Panama
List of airports in Panama

References

External links
OpenStreetMap - Bahia Pina Airport
OurAirports - Bahia Pina Airport
FallilngRain - Puerto Piña

Airports in Panama
Buildings and structures in Darién Province